is a Nippon Professional Baseball player for the Yomiuri Giants in Japan's Central League.  He was named the 2009 Central League Rookie of the Year.

External links

1984 births
Japanese baseball players
Living people
Nippon Professional Baseball outfielders
Nippon Professional Baseball Rookie of the Year Award winners
Baseball people from Yamanashi Prefecture
Senshu University alumni
Yomiuri Giants players
Japanese baseball coaches
Nippon Professional Baseball coaches